John Terry (born January 25, 1950) is an American film, television, and stage actor. He is perhaps best known for his role as Christian Shephard in the TV series Lost and Larry McCoy in the TV series Las Vegas. He is also the father of football player Hanna Terry of KIF Örebro DFF in the Swedish women's football league Damallsvenskan.

Early life
Terry was born in Vero Beach, Florida, where he attended Vero Beach High School. He was also educated at the prestigious Loomis Chaffee prep school in Windsor, Connecticut, and began a career building original custom log homes in North Carolina. He played roles in local theater before moving to Alaska where he founded a river rafting company. But his interest in acting did not diminish. At age 30 he moved to New York City and became a full-time actor.

Career
Terry's debut role was as the title character in the 1980 fantasy film Hawk the Slayer, followed by roles in films such as There Goes the Bride (1980), Tuxedo Warrior (1982) and the action sequel Wild Geese II (1985), as Barbara Carrera's brother. His career then took a major upswing as he was assigned the roles of Lieutenant Lockhart in Stanley Kubrick's Full Metal Jacket (1987) and Felix Leiter in the James Bond film The Living Daylights (1987).  Nothing as prominent followed immediately, though he received good notices for his role as a traumatized Vietnam veteran in Norman Jewison's In Country (1989). Terry subsequently played the lead in a well-regarded but short-lived TV series Against the Grain. Terry played Slim in the 1992 film adaptation of Of Mice and Men and also appeared in The Resurrected (1992), an adaption of the H. P. Lovecraft novella The Case of Charles Dexter Ward.

He found new success on television. He appeared in the first episodes of ER playing Dr. Div Cvetic, the love interest of Dr. Lewis, who disappeared after a nervous breakdown.  He later played a recurring role in season two of Fox's real-time thriller 24, as Bob Warner, the father of both the love interest of hero Jack Bauer and of another daughter whose fiancé is suspected of being a terrorist.

After a brief stint on NBC's Las Vegas, he was cast as Christian Shephard, the father of Jack Shephard and Claire Littleton on ABC's Lost. Terry reprised his role as Shephard on several occasions in flashbacks before appearing frequently in real time on the island as an incarnation of "the man in black". He had a guest role in a 2006 episode of Law & Order, as well as the part of older Jacob Wheeler in Steven Spielberg's Into the West mini series, which was nominated for 16 Emmy Awards in 2006. He also appeared in David Fincher's Zodiac, Matthew McConaughey's Surfer, Dude, and the horror thriller Nine Dead.

Filmography
There Goes the Bride (1980) – Nicholas Babcock
Hotwire (1980) – Billy Ed Wallace
Hawk the Slayer (1980) – Hawk
Wilhelm Cuceritorul (1982) – King Harold II
Tuxedo Warrior (1982) – Wiley
The Scarlet and the Black (1983) – Lt. Harry Barnett
Wild Geese II (1985) – Michael
Full Metal Jacket (1987) – Lt. Lockhart
The Living Daylights (1987) – Felix Leiter
In Country (1989) – Tom
The Resurrected (1991) – John March
Of Mice and Men (1992) – Slim
A Dangerous Woman (1993) – Steve
Iron Will (1994) – Jack Stoneman
Reflections on a Crime (1994) – James
The Big Green (1995) – Edwin V. Douglas
Heartwood (1998) – Joe Orsini
Blue Valley Songbird (1999) – Hank
Lost (2004–2010) - Dr. Christian Shephard
Steal Me (2005) – Father
Crazylove (2005) – Mr. Mayer
Zodiac (2007) – Charles Thieriot
Surfer, Dude (2008) – Mercer Martin
The Way of War (2009) – Secretary of Defence
Nine Dead (2009) – Shooter
CSI: NY (2009) – McCanna Taylor
The Fortune Theory (2013) – Howard Fitzroy

References

External links

 John Terry profile, Felixleiter.com; accessed October 10, 2014.

1950 births
American male film actors
American male stage actors
American male television actors
American people of Irish descent
Living people
Male actors from Florida
Vero Beach High School alumni
Place of birth missing (living people)
Loomis Chaffee School alumni